RARBG is a website that provides torrent files and magnet links to facilitate peer-to-peer file sharing using the BitTorrent protocol. From 2014 onward, RARBG has repeatedly appeared in TorrentFreak's yearly list of most visited torrent websites. It was ranked 5th as of June 2021, and 4th as of Feb 2023. The website does not allow users to upload their own torrents.

History 
RARBG was founded in 2008. Originally conceived as a Bulgarian BitTorrent tracker (BG stands for "Bulgaria" in the name), the website has been serving an international audience since then. According to TorrentFreak, RARBG specializes in English-language "high quality video releases, but lists other content as well, including games, software and music."

The website has been described in 2019 as a "notorious market" by the US trade representative. In 2020, the website was listed as a target of Bulgarian law enforcement.

Blocking and censorship 
RARBG is blocked in several countries around the world for legal reasons, generally due to its facilitation of copyright infringement. In December 2008, the site remained closed for one week due to legal pressure from BREIN. In 2017, RARBG was filtered out of Google search results following a controversy wherein links to torrent sites were highlighted in Google's "carousel" search results. Due to a lawsuit brought forth against ISP Hurricane Electric by film studios demanding the personal information of pirates, Sophidea VPN, a VPN service operated through Hurricane Electric, blocked access to several torrent sites as of December 2020, including RARBG.

See also 
 Comparison of BitTorrent sites
 Websites blocked in the United Kingdom

References

External links 
 

BitTorrent websites
Notorious markets
Internet properties established in 2008
Internet censorship in India